Arash Roshanipour is an Iranian football midfielder, who currently plays for Saba Qom in Iran's Premier Football League.

Career
Roshanipour joined Mes Kerman in summer 2012. He made his debut for Mes Kerman on 17 August, when he was brought on as a substitute.

Club career statistics

References

External links
 Arash Roshanipour at PersianLeague.com
 

Iranian footballers
Association football midfielders
Sanat Mes Kerman F.C. players
F.C. Aboomoslem players
Steel Azin F.C. players
1988 births
Living people